Sir Edward Seymour, 3rd Baronet (10 September 1610 – 4 December 1688) of Berry Pomeroy Castle was an English politician who sat in the House of Commons at various times between 1640 and 1688. He fought for the Royalist cause in the English Civil War.

Seymour was the eldest son of Sir Edward Seymour, 2nd Baronet, of Berry Pomeroy Castle, and his wife Dorothy Killegrew and a descendant of Edward Seymour, 1st Duke of Somerset, in the senior line. Because of the adultery of the Duke's first wife, the Dukedom had been entailed with preference to the sons of his second marriage.

In April 1640, Seymour was elected Member of Parliament for Devon in the Short Parliament. He was re-elected MP for Devon for the Long Parliament in November 1640. He was appointed a colonel in the Royalist army in 1642 and was disabled from sitting in parliament in 1643. In the latter part of the Civil War, he was imprisoned in Exeter and was not released until 1655. He inherited the baronetcy of Berry Pomeroy on the death of his father in 1659.

After the Restoration in 1660, Seymour became Deputy Lieutenant for Devon, In 1661 he was elected MP for Totnes in the Cavalier Parliament and sat until 1679. He was appointed Vice-Admiral of Devon in 1677 and held the position until his death. He served as High Sheriff of Devon for 1679–80. He was re-elected MP for Totnes in 1685 and sat until his death.

Seymour died at the age of 78 and was buried on 7 December 1688. After his death, an inventory of Berry Pomeroy Castle was drawn up.

Family
Seymour married Anne Portman (died 1695) in 1630, the daughter of Sir John Portman, 1st Baronet, of Orchard Portman, Somerset (25 November 1612), and his wife Anne Gifford. They had five sons and two daughters:
Sir Edward Seymour, 4th Baronet (1633–1708) 
Capt. Hugh Seymour
Capt. Charles Seymour 
William Seymour, died unmarried
Henry Seymour Portman, of Orchard Portman, Somerset (c. 1637 – 23 February 1728), who assumed the name of Portman on inheriting from his cousin Sir William Portman, 6th Baronet, married firstly to Penelope Haslewood, daughter of Sir William Haslewood, of Maidwell, Northampton, and married secondly to Meliora Fitch, daughter of William Fitch, of High Hall, Dorset. His widow married Thomas Fownes. He died without issue by either of his marriages
Elizabeth Seymour, married to Sir Joseph Tredenham, of Tregony, Cornwall
Jane Seymour, married William James Edwards

Ancestry

References

1610 births
1688 deaths
Baronets in the Baronetage of England
Edward Seymour, 3rd baronet
Cavaliers
High Sheriffs of Devon
Members of the Parliament of England (pre-1707) for Totnes
English MPs 1640 (April)
English MPs 1640–1648
English MPs 1660
English MPs 1661–1679
English MPs 1679
English MPs 1680–1681
English MPs 1685–1687
Members of the Parliament of England (pre-1707) for Devon